Consumers Energy is an investor owned utility that provides natural gas and electricity to 6.7 million of Michigan's 10 million residents.  It serves customers in all 68 of the state's Lower Peninsula counties. It is the primary subsidiary of CMS Energy. The company was founded in 1886 and is currently headquartered in Jackson, Michigan.

History

The company was founded in 1886 as Jackson Electric Light Works by William A. Foote, Samuel Jarvis, of Lansing, and his brother James B. Foote, who was originally tasked to install electric lighting in downtown Jackson. After a series of acquisitions and mergers involving other local electric, gas, and trolley companies which were properties of W.A. Foote, as well as Anton G. Hodenpyl and Henry. D. Walbridge, the company incorporated as Consumers Power Company in 1910 in Maine. It became part of the utility holding conglomerate Commonwealth & Southern Corporation, which held utilities in 10 other states. His wife later founded Foote Hospital, now Henry Ford Allegiance Health, also in Jackson, Michigan.

Commonwealth and Southern dissolved in 1946, leaving Consumers Power (and all other utility holdings) an independent company. After serving Michigan for more than 80 years, the company reincorporated in Michigan in 1968 and maintained its headquarters in Jackson, Michigan. Consumers operated the Big Rock Point Nuclear Power Plant in Charlevoix from 1962 to 1997 and built the Palisades Nuclear Plant near South Haven in 1971, which was sold to Entergy.

In 1968, Consumers Power began construction of a nuclear power plant in Midland, Michigan, primarily for the Dow Chemical Company. However, construction issues caused delays and increased costs. The Three Mile Island accident in 1979 resulted in a massive change in nuclear regulatory requirements and system redesign. When it was revealed the containment buildings were settling and foundation cracks were discovered, Dow cancelled its contract with Consumers Power, and the project was abandoned in 1984. The $4.1 billion investment nearly bankrupted Consumers Power. However, in 1985, Consumers Power formed a partnership with eight other companies to convert Midland's abandoned nuclear plant into a natural gas-fired power plant. Transformation of the plant began in 1986 and was completed at a cost of $500 million. The Midland Cogeneration Venture began producing power in 1991 and that success restored faith in Consumers Power.

In 1997, the name of the company was changed to Consumers Energy. In 2011, Consumers Energy received approval to establish a 100-megawatt wind energy facility in Michigan's Mason County called Lake Winds Energy Park. In 2014, the company announced their second wind farm in Tuscola County with a total investment of $250 million, and named it Cross Winds Energy Park. By 2015, Consumers Energy produced ten percent of its electricity from renewable sources.

In 2009, Consumers Energy launched comprehensive electric and natural gas energy efficiency programs that included rebates and incentives for homes and businesses. Consumers Energy's trademark slogan is "Count on Us", and it is the primary subsidiary of CMS Energy.

In 2018, Consumers Energy announced plans to retire all coal-burning plants by 2040 and expects to have 40% renewable power by then. In 2018, Consumers Energy became the title sponsor of the August Monster Energy NASCAR Cup Series race at Michigan International Speedway.

In December 2020, Garrick J. Rochow assumed the role of President & CEO of CMS and Consumers Energy after a 17-year tenure at the company.

System information

Because of utility regulatory changes, Consumers divested its transmission system. It opted instead to sell the system to the Michigan Electric Transmission Company (METC), currently an ITC Holdings company (which also owns Detroit Edison's transmission system under the "ITCTransmission" brand.) Consumers Energy's primary distribution voltages are 2.77/4.8Y, 4.8/8.32Y, 7.2/12.47Y, 7.97/13.8Y and 14.4/24.9Y. Consumers retained its looped 23kV and 46kV high voltage sub-transmission (HVD) systems and its radial 138 kV lines as well.

Generating portfolio
Consumers Energy's utility-owned generation portfolio consists of a hydroelectric system, including part ownership of Ludington Pumped Storage, wind farms, nuclear power plant, and coal-fired plants and natural gas peakers.

Hydroelectric
Consumers Energy owns 13 hydroelectric facilities or dams along five rivers in Michigan. Built between 1906 and 1935, the hydros have a combined generating capacity of about 130 megawatts, enough to serve about 70,000 people. Near the hydros are campgrounds, boat launches and nature trails that are popular spots for canoeing, fishing and bird watching. The facilities are located on the Au Sable River (Mio Hydro, Alcona Hydro, Loud Hydro, Five Channels Hydro, Cooke Hydro, Foote Hydro), Grand River (Webber Hydro), Kalamazoo River (Allegan Hydro), Manistee River (Hodenpyl Hydro, Tippy Hydro) and Muskegon River (Rogers Hydro, Hardy Hydro, Croton Hydro). Operating since 1907, the Webber Hydro on the Grand River is the company's oldest operating hydroelectric facility. The Croton Hydro on the Muskegon River was listed in the National Register of Historic Places on August 16, 1979.

Following is a complete, sortable list of Consumers Energy's hydroelectric generating facilities:

Pumped Storage
Consumers Energy also operates and co-owns (with DTE Energy) the Ludington Pumped Storage Power Plant near Ludington. Built between 1969 and 1973, the plant sits on a 1,000-acre site along the Lake Michigan shoreline. It includes an 842-acre reservoir that can store up to 27 billion gallons of water — the equivalent of 2 million backyard swimming pools.

Nuclear
Consumers Energy operated the Big Rock Point Nuclear Power Plant near Charlevoix, Michigan. The plant operated for 35 years, until 1997 when it closed. It was Michigan's first nuclear power plant and the United States' fifth nuclear plant, capable of producing 67 megawatts of electricity. Palisades Nuclear Generating Station (five miles south of South Haven) was previously owned by Consumers Energy and was shut down in May of 2022.

Fossil fuels

Coal
Consumers Energy's largest power plant is the coal-powered J.H. Campbell power plant between Holland and Grand Haven. The other remaining coal-fired plant is the D.E. Karn generating station located on Saginaw Bay near Bay City. The Cobb power plant in Muskegon; the Whiting power plant on Lake Erie in Luna Pier, just north of the Michigan-Ohio state line and the J.C. Weadock Generating Plant were all coal plants that ceased operating in 2016. Consumers Energy originally planned to close its remaining coal plants by 2040 but the plan was sped up to close all plants by 2025.

Natural gas
The Midland Cogeneration Venture in Midland was formerly owned by Consumer Power and still supplies power to them. Additional natural gas units are planned to replace the retiring coal plants.

Consumers Energy also uses natural gas and oil peaking units. These include the Zeeland Generating Station, Karn 3&4 Generating Station, and combustion turbine stations.

Natural gas distribution and storage
Consumers Energy is a natural gas distributor in Michigan. Its annual quantity of 373 billion cubic feet is distributed to its residential and business customers. The company purchases all natural gas that it provides its customers. In 2013, it was fined $1.4 million for its role in two gas explosions that killed three people.

Electric vehicles 
In early 2018, General Motors (GM) and Consumers announced that they formed a partnership to develop "smart charging" technology for owners of electric vehicles. Consumers Energy plans to buy or lease over 100 electric vehicles from GM. The two companies will test new electric vehicle charging technology. The technology will let vehicle owners plug in their car to be charged, but it will delay the actual charging until nighttime during off-peak energy hours. Additionally, Consumers will invest $7.5 million "to encourage the development of EV charging stations across Michigan."

Philanthropy
Annually, Consumers Energy awards about $10 million to Michigan nonprofit organizations through grants, employee and retiree contributions and, corporate giving. It has helped to raise over $1.8 million towards United Way's Michigan campaign initiatives, created fund-raising campaigns at their facilities and participated in employee-volunteer events. Consumers Energy has also worked on early childhood development and education in Michigan and has also received Wildlife Habitat Council (WHC) compliant certificates for its efforts to promote environmental education.

In 2013, Consumers Energy was given the William Booth Award by The Salvation Army in recognition of its long history of philanthropic activities and leadership for the PeopleCare assistance program. Since the beginning of PeopleCare program, it has contributed $27 million in energy bill credits.

External links 
 Consumers Energy website
 Official CMS Energy site

Footnotes

Electric power companies of the United States
CMS Energy
Hydroelectric power companies of the United States
Natural gas companies of the United States
Nuclear power companies of the United States
Companies based in Jackson, Michigan
Non-renewable resource companies established in 1886
1886 establishments in Michigan

American corporate subsidiaries